The 2013–14 Louisiana–Lafayette Ragin' Cajuns women's basketball team represented the University of Louisiana at Lafayette during the 2013–14 NCAA Division I women's basketball season. The Ragin' Cajuns were led by second-year head coach Gary Broadhead; they played their double-header home games at the Cajundome with other games at the Earl K. Long Gymnasium, which is located on campus. They were members in the Sun Belt Conference. They finished the season 14–16, 7–11 in Sun Belt play to finish in a two-way tie for seventh place. They were eliminated in the first round of the Sun Belt women's tournament.

Previous season 
The Ragin' Cajuns finished the 2013–14 season 10–21, 3–17 in Sun Belt play to finish in a two-way tie for tenth place in the conference. They made it to the 2013 Sun Belt Conference women's basketball tournament, losing in the quarterfinal game by a score of 57–61 to the Western Kentucky Hilltoppers. They were not invited to any other postseason tournament.

Roster

Schedule and results

|-
!colspan=9 style=| Exhibition

|-
!colspan=9 style=| Non-conference regular season

|-
!colspan=9 style=| Sun Belt regular season

|-
!colspan=9 style=| Sun Belt Women's Tournament (0-1)

See also
 2013–14 Louisiana–Lafayette Ragin' Cajuns men's basketball team

References

Louisiana Ragin' Cajuns women's basketball seasons
Louisiana-Lafayette
Louisiana
Louisiana